"Santa Claus Is Back in Town" is a Christmas song written in 1957 by Jerry Leiber and Mike Stoller, and first recorded that year by Elvis Presley as the opening track on Elvis' Christmas Album, the best-selling Christmas/holiday album of all time in the United States. The song has become a rock and roll Christmas standard.

"Santa Claus Is Back in Town" was paired with "Santa, Bring My Baby Back to Me" and was issued as a UK single concurrently with the album's release in 1957. The single reached #7 on the UK Singles Chart in November 1957. RCA rereleased the song as a 45 vinyl 7" single in 1985, PB-14237B, paired with "Merry Christmas, Baby". In 1980, the song reached #41 on the UK singles chart in December in a six-week chart run.
 
"Santa Claus Is Back in Town" backed with "Blue Christmas" was released by RCA Victor as a 45 single in 1965 in the US, reaching #4 on the Billboard Christmas Singles chart. The "Blue Christmas"/"Santa Claus is Back in Town" single was certified Platinum by the RIAA in 1999.

Synopsis
The song, set in a basic twelve-bar blues layout with three verses, consists of an elaborate double entendre in which the singer, identifying himself as Santa Claus but having no sleigh, reindeer or sack of toys, promises to arrive in "a big black Cadillac" with the intent of "coming down (a young woman's) chimney" Christmas Eve.

Album appearances
The song appeared on the original RCA Victor LP, Elvis' Christmas Album, the 1958 reissue, the 1970 RCA Camden reissue, the UK release of the Camden version, CDS 1155, the 1975 Pickwick reissue, and the 1985 RCA Special Products rerelease. The song also appeared on the 1982 RCA Memories of Christmas compilation, the 1994 BMG album If Every Day Was Like Christmas, the 2003 BMG Christmas Peace collection, and the 2006 BMG Elvis Christmas album. The song was featured on the 2008 Presley album Christmas Duets in a duet with Wynonna Judd.

The song is the opening track on the 2017 album Christmas with Elvis and the Royal Philharmonic Orchestra.

Personnel
"Santa Claus Is Back In Town" was recorded on September 7, 1957, at Radio Recorders, Hollywood, California. The musicians on the session were:
 
 Elvis Presley – vocals 
 Scotty Moore – guitar 
 Bill Black – bass 
 D. J. Fontana – drums 
 Dudley Brooks – piano 
 Millie Kirkham and The Jordanaires (Gordon Stoker, Neal Matthews Jr., Hoyt Hawkins, and Hugh Jarrett) – backing vocals

Covers
Many musical artists have covered the song. Notably, Dwight Yoakam featured the song on his 1997 Christmas album Come On Christmas and released it as a single. The single reached #60 on the Billboard Hot Country Songs chart.

The song was covered by Nashville band, The Royal Court of China and featured, along with Floyd Cramer, Elvis Presley's original band, D. J. Fontana, Scotty Moore, Jimmy "Orion" Ellis, and The Jordanaires on MWC America Records. This was the last recording the original members appeared on together.

Another notable version was by Robert Plant and The Honeydrippers, as performed on Saturday Night Live on December 15, 1984. Jonny Lang covered it on 1997's A Very Special Christmas 3. Little Steven and the Disciples of Soul covered the song for the 2018 film The Christmas Chronicles.

Chart performance

The recording was a top ten hit on the UK Singles Chart and a top five hit on the Billboard Christmas Singles chart. The single was certified Platinum by the RIAA.

Elvis Presley recording

1980 Elvis Presley re-release

Dwight Yoakam recording

Movie appearances
Iron Man 3 (2013)
Fred Claus (2007)
Miracle on 34th Street (1994) 
C.R.A.Z.Y. (2005)
The Long Kiss Goodnight (1996)
Bad Santa 2 (2016)
The Christmas Chronicles (2018)

References

Sources
Guralnick, Peter. The King of Rock 'n' Roll: The Complete 50's Masters, insert booklet. RCA 66050–2, 1992.
Guralnick, Peter. From Nashville to Memphis: The Essential '60s Masters, insert booklet. RCA 66160–2, 1993.
Guralnick, Peter (1994). Last Train to Memphis: The Rise of Elvis Presley. Little Brown GBR. .
Hopkins, Jerry (1971). Elvis: A Biography. .
Wolfe, Charles. Elvis Presley: If Every Day Was Like Christmas, liner notes. BMG Australia Limited, 7863664822, 1994.

External links
 Rock and Roll Hall of Fame: 20 Essential Rock and Roll Holiday Songs.

Songs about Santa Claus
Elvis Presley songs
1957 songs
American Christmas songs
Dwight Yoakam songs
Songs written by Jerry Leiber and Mike Stoller